The Beaumont, Sour Lake and Western Railway was an  railroad that ran from Beaumont, Texas to Gulf Coast Junction in Houston. It passed through small southeast Texas communities such as Hull, Kenefick, and Huffman.  As part of the Gulf Coast Lines system, the road was eventually merged into the Missouri Pacific Railroad in 1956, which in turn was merged into the Union Pacific Railroad in 1982.  The Union Pacific still makes heavy use of the route.

History

The Gulf Coast Lines were projected originally by B. F. Yoakum, chairman of the board of the Rock Island and Frisco Lines. Yoakum's plan envisioned using the Rock Island and Frisco, together with several railroads to be built in Texas and Louisiana and now known as the Gulf Coast Lines, to form a continuous line of railroad extending from Chicago, St. Louis and Memphis to Baton Rouge, Houston, Brownsville, Tampico and Mexico City. 

The Beaumont, Sour Lake and Western Railway Company was chartered on August 8, 1903, as the Beaumont, Sour Lake and Port Arthur Traction Company. Construction of the Beaumont, Sour Lake and Western section was started at Beaumont in October, 1903. The name was changed on June 30, 1904. R. C. Duff and other financial backers from Columbus, Ohio, and Beaumont, Texas, organized the Traction Company to build an electric line between Port Arthur and Sour Lake. The renamed railroad amended its charter to allow it to connect Beaumont with Port Arthur, Sour Lake, Batson, and Houston, and to transport freight, passengers, mail and express.

However, as Port Arthur seemed increasingly unlikely to overtake Houston as a major shipping center, and as Sour Lake oilfield production declined, some of the original investors lost heart. Yoakum purchased the properties in 1905 and placed them in service to Houston on December 31, 1907, simultaneously with the beginning of operation of the St. Louis, Brownsville and Mexico from Houston to Brownsville.

After joining the Gulf Coast Lines, the BSL&W was extended from Grayburg to Houston in December 1907 despite high water and the threat of yellow fever along the Trinity River. In 1916 the BSL&W reported passenger earnings of $180,000 and freight earnings of $604,000. The eighty-five-mile line became part of the Missouri Pacific system in 1924, but continued to operate as a separate company until merged with the MP on March 1, 1956.

Houston North Shore Line

The Houston North Shore Line was constructed for the convenience of commuters between Houston and the towns of Baytown, Goose Creek and Pelly (the "tri-cities" region). The line was purchased by Missouri Pacific. MP continued commuter service without interruption. Beaumont, Sour Lake & Western acquired the line from MP, and operated it as part of the BSL&W's transportation system on the MP right-of-way.

Curiously, the HNS, after purchase by BSL&W never actually connected with other elements of the BSL&W system. Tickets and schedules were issued under that name, but there was no physical meeting of branches for exchange of passengers, etc. From the 1920s until the late 1940s, the interurban line was powered by electrical overhead catenary. Freight operations were powered by steam. In 1948, the line converted to diesel-powered busses, laid on frames of busses as built for city bus lines.

In its early years, the major stopping points for passenger were: Goose Creek (terminus); the Humble Oil Refinery (the largest contributor of revenue); Highlands (a small suburban community), and Houston. In earlier times, the electrified trains ran several schedules along these points.  It was an incentive for each community's population to shop, work and visit the Houston metropolis, and return home in time for dinner. In the 1940s, the line was downgraded to diesel-busses, as the post-war economy emphasized personal transportation with automobiles eagerly produced by Detroit manufacturers to enable them to return to a peacetime, and profitable, footing.

Toward the end, the interurban was primarily a vehicle for commuting by personal servants going to and from work and home; occasionally, field trips for grade-school students on a day-long outing would take them from Goose Creek to the turn-around point at MP's Market Street Yard, on Houston's fringe area. The round trip lasted about two hours.

BSL&W's losses ran to a million dollars per year on this branch. The railroad regularly petitioned the ICC for permission to cancel the service; it was typically denied. In 1961, the ICC finally granted the petition to end the service, and BSL&W ended its presence in the area.

Current
This railway is now owned and operated by Union Pacific Railroad, successor to MoPac. Predominantly a single track railroad with limited sidings, it is normally restricted to eastbound traffic, averaging around 15 trains daily including Amtrak's eastbound Sunset Limited.

References

 The Empire That Missouri Pacific Serves

 https://web.archive.org/web/20071008091840/http://www.houstonrailplan.com/projects/beaumont.htm

Gulf Coast Lines
Predecessors of the Missouri Pacific Railroad
Defunct Texas railroads
Former Class I railroads in the United States
Railway companies established in 1904
Railway companies disestablished in 1956
1903 establishments in Texas
1956 disestablishments in Texas
Beaumont, Texas
American companies disestablished in 1956
American companies established in 1903